Wenden Lofts is a village and a civil parish in the Uttlesford district, in the county of Essex, England.

References

External links 

Villages in Essex
Civil parishes in Essex
Uttlesford